Tamara Nikolayevna Rylova (1 October 1931 – 1 February 2021) was a speed skater.

Career
After World War II had ended, Soviet women started dominating speed skating and would continue do so for at least 20 years. Tamara Rylova was one of them. She trained at Burevestnik in Leningrad. Having debuted nationally at the 1952 Soviet Allround Championships and internationally at the 1954 World Allround Championships, Rylova soon became a force to be reckoned with. Early 1955, Rylova proved this by setting a new world record on the 500 m – breaking Laila Schou Nilsen's record that had stood for almost 18 years. That same month, she would break two more world records.

The next month, she won silver at the 1955 World Allround Championships behind fellow Soviet skater Rimma Zhukova and that already showed that most of the time, Rylova's strongest competition was from other Soviet skaters. The next year, she won bronze, behind two Soviet skaters, thus making all three medals going to the Soviet Union. And this was not an exception, rather it was the rule. In fact, in the years 1953–1964, Soviet women won all three medals at every one of those twelve World Allround Championships.

In 1957 and 1958, Rylova won two more silver medals at the World Allround Championships, both behind Inga Artamonova. Finally, in 1959, she became World Allround Champion, with a big lead over silver medallist Valentina Stenina. The next year, she won yet another silver medal at the 1960 World Allround Championships, this time not being able to retain her lead after three of the four distances because Stenina skated the final distance, the 3,000 m, more than seven seconds faster. At the Winter Olympics of Squaw Valley the next month, Rylova (now the world record holder on the 500 m and the 1,000 m) had a somewhat disappointing performance; she finished fourth on the 500 m, one tenth of a second short of a medal, and she won the bronze medal on the 1,000 m.

After that, Rylova would not make any more international appearances except once, four years later, when she won another bronze medal at the 1964 World Allround Championship. During the intermediate years, she had not won much on a national level. Her last appearance at the Soviet Allround Championships was in 1966.

Medals
An overview of medals won by Rylova at important championships she participated in, listing the years in which she won each:

World records
Over the course of her career, Rylova skated four world records:

References

External links
 
 Tamara Rylova at SkateResults.com
 Results of Soviet Championships at SpeedSkating.ru
 Short biography of Tamara Rylova (in Russian)

1931 births
2021 deaths
People from Vologda
Soviet female speed skaters
Speed skaters at the 1960 Winter Olympics
Olympic speed skaters of the Soviet Union
Olympic bronze medalists for the Soviet Union
Burevestnik (sports society) athletes
Olympic medalists in speed skating
World record setters in speed skating
Russian female speed skaters
Medalists at the 1960 Winter Olympics
World Allround Speed Skating Championships medalists
Sportspeople from Vologda